Patricia Apollonia Kotero (born August 2, 1959) is an American singer, actress, former model and talent manager. She is known for co-starring in Prince's 1984 film Purple Rain and for having been the lead singer of the girl group Apollonia 6.

Early life
Kotero was born in San Pedro, California, the daughter of immigrants from Mexico, and the eldest of four children. Her father, Victor, was a restaurant manager, and her mother, Socorro, was a caregiver for the elderly. She dropped out of school at 16 to pursue a career as a model.

Career

Early career
Kotero worked as an actress, singer and a model. After winning the Miss San Pedro beauty competition, and following her stint as a cheerleader for the Los Angeles Rams in the early 1980s, Kotero began acting in film and television series such as CHiPs, Tales of the Gold Monkey, Fantasy Island, Matt Houston, and Knight Rider. In September 1982, she appeared in the music video "Shakin'" by Eddie Money. In May 1984, she appeared in the ABC television film The Mystic Warrior as the Native American woman Wicahpi. While dating Van Halen singer David Lee Roth, on and off when they were both in Los Angeles, she auditioned for Purple Rain. Roth had followed her modeling career and hired her for a Star of the Cars magazine cover.

Prince and Purple Rain
When then-leader of Vanity 6, Denise "Vanity" Matthews, resigned from its membership before Prince's 1984 film Purple Rain was filmed, Kotero landed the film's female lead role. Vanity 6, which was renamed Apollonia 6 for the film, also featured supporting singers Brenda Bennett and Prince's then-girlfriend Susan Moonsie. Apollonia 6 embarked on a worldwide tour to promote their hit single, "Sex Shooter".

Kotero had written half the lyrics and originally recorded a version of the song "Manic Monday" for the 1984 album Apollonia 6. The album was written and composed by Prince, the song later became a worldwide hit single for The Bangles. Prince's song "Take Me with U" featured vocals by Kotero, and it reached #25 on the Billboard Top 40 chart in the United States.

In 1985, Kotero left Prince's camp to appear on the CBS primetime soap opera Falcon Crest, playing Apollonia, the girlfriend of the character played by Lorenzo Lamas, for ten consecutive weeks. She performed several solo songs, including "Red Light Romeo", written and composed by Jon Lind.

Later career
In 1988, Warner Bros. Records released Kotero's eponymously titled first solo album, Apollonia. Three singles were taken from the album: "Since I Fell for You", "The Same Dream" and "Mismatch".

She went on to appear in such films as Ministry of Vengeance (1989), Back To Back (1990), Black Magic Woman (1991), and two Italian productions: La Donna di una Sera (A Lady for a Night) (1991) and Cattive Ragazze (1992). She returned to television on such shows as Sliders and Air America (which co-starred Lorenzo Lamas, her former co-star in Falcon Crest), and also hosted The Jazz Channel's Latin Beat program. During this period an exercise video entitled Go For It was also released. Kotero could also be seen on E!'s Celebrity Homes, The Test, Rendezview, and MTV Cribs, with her friend Carmen Electra.

In 2005, Kotero formed a multimedia entertainment company, Kotero Entertainment, which enlisted a number of producers to produce a children's animated television series as well as feature films. Kotero Entertainment also began managing young talent such as television and film star Sascha Andres and young pop singer Nikki Barreras, also known as Nikki B..

In 2009, Kotero's vocals appeared on The Twilight Singers cover of Prince's "When Doves Cry" for Spin magazine's 25th anniversary tribute to the Purple Rain album, entitled Purplish Rain.

Personal life 
Apollonia was married to Greg Patschull, an aspiring actor and martial artist, from 1980 to 1985. She dated singer David Lee Roth during the filming of Purple Rain. Her second marriage was to actor Kevin Bernhardt from 1987 to 1997.

Discography

Studio albums
 Apollonia (1988)

with Apollonia 6
 Apollonia 6 (1984)

Singles

 The "Take Me with U" duet reached No. 7 in the United Kingdom, becoming Kotero's only chart entry in the country.

Filmography

Film

Television

References

External links
 
 
 
 Read Apollonia's Open Letter to Prince: 'The Pain Is Unbearable' Billboard (September 1, 2016)

1959 births
20th-century American actresses
21st-century American actresses
Living people
Actresses from Santa Monica, California
American actresses of Mexican descent
American cheerleaders
American dance musicians
American women singers
American film actresses
American freestyle musicians
American funk singers
American soul singers
American television actresses
Apollonia 6 members
Female models from California
Women new wave singers
Feminist musicians
Hispanic and Latino American musicians
Musicians from Santa Monica, California
National Football League cheerleaders
Hispanic and Latino American women singers